Smoke in the Wind is a 1975 American Western film directed by Andy Brennan and Joseph Kane. It marked Walter Brennan's final film role as he died over six months before the film's release.

Plot
In 1865, the American Civil War has just ended as the action in this work begins, following five Union soldiers - Pa Mondier, his two sons, and Smoky - as they return to their homes in the Ozarks of northern Arkansas, matter-of-factly planning a resumption of their pre-War existences.

However, many residents from the village of Winslow and its surrounding region are averse to offering a helping hand to Yankees, Arkansas having been a member of the Confederate States of America.

Mort Fagan leads some ex-Confederate soldiers in an attack against the former Unionists, resulting in Pa Mondier being mortally wounded, triggering a feud.

Some Winslow citizens are working to close the nation's divisiveness and it is to them that the returning veterans must look for support.

Cast
John Ashley as Whipple Mondier
John Russell as Cagle Mondier
Myron Healey as Mort Fagan
Walter Brennan as H. P. Kingman
Susan Huston as Laurie Cullen
Linda Weld as Sarah Kimbrough
Henry Kingi as Smoky Harjo
Adair Jameson as Hannah Mondier
Dan White as Col. Joab Cullen
Lorna as Ma Mondier
Billy Hughes, Jr. as Till Mondier
Bill Coontz as Stapp Huckaby
Jack Horton as Gib
Bill McKenzie as The Bartender

Production
Smoke in the Wind was filmed in Winslow, Arkansas, and local Strawberry Henson played a preacher. The General Store and most of the town was not modified for the film. The script was by Eric Allen, a journalist and Western author.

The film was made by two stuntmen turned producers, Billy and White Hughes. They were from Arkansas and White Hughes had doubled for John Ashley a number of times. Ashley says the brothers "went back to Arkansas and promoted a bunch of turkey ranchers to put up some money, I think about $400,000. They did this on the basis of them being able to deliver Walter Brennan." Ashley says Brennan agreed to make the film if his son Andy would direct. John Ashley knew the Hugheses and agreed to be in it because he wanted to work with Brennan. " I'd do it for nothing, but if I committed to it and it turned out that they didn't have him I'd walk out," said Ashley. He says they got a gaffer, Mario Tosi, to work on the film by giving him the opportunity to be cinematographer. Ashley made it shortly after Beast of the Yellow Night.

According to Ashley filming was difficult and Andy Brennan "had some personal problems. And it was not going well". The Hughes brothers replaced him with Joe Kane. Walter Brennan stayed on the film even though he was ill with emphysema at the time. Ashley says the filmmakers ran out of money after filming was completed; Whitey Hughes eventually raised the money to complete it.

"I was so impressed with Walter, said Ashley. "He hung in there. He got to know these ranchers, and they would hang out at this trailer. He had done this movie for his son, but he wouldn't walk off the movie. ... Any moment that I had, that I wasn't in front of the camera, I would go sit in his trailer and ask him questions about the 
old days, he was a great story teller. That's the whole reason I did the movie. I would have paid them to hang out with this guy."

Ashley later said he was not happy being billed over Brennan.

Reception
The Monthly Film Bulletin called the film "lethargic".

See also
 List of American films of 1975

References

External links

Smoke in the Wind at TCMDB

1975 films
1975 Western (genre) films
American Western (genre) films
Films shot in Arkansas
Films directed by Joseph Kane
1970s English-language films
1970s American films
American Civil War films
Films set in 1865
Films set in Arkansas
Films set in the Ozarks